The 1996 Budapest Lotto Open was a women's tennis tournament played on outdoor clay courts in Budapest in Hungary that was part of Tier IV of the 1996 WTA Tour. It was the inaugural edition of the tournament and was held from 6 May until 12 May 1996. Sixth-seeded Ruxandra Dragomir won the singles title.

Finals

Singles

 Ruxandra Dragomir defeated  Melanie Schnell 7–6, 6–1
 It was Dragomir's 1st title of the year and the 3rd of her career.

Doubles

 Katrina Adams /  Debbie Graham defeated  Radka Bobková /  Eva Melicharová 6–3, 7–6
 It was Adams' 1st title of the year and the 18th of her career. It was Graham's 1st title of the year and the 3rd of her career.

References

External links
 ITF tournament edition details

Budapest Lotto Open
Budapest Grand Prix
Buda
Buda